The Osorkon Bust, also known as the Eliba'l Inscription is a bust of Egyptian pharaoh Osorkon I, discovered in Byblos (in today's Lebanon) in the 19th century. Like the Tabnit sarcophagus from Sidon, it is decorated with two separate and unrelated inscriptions – one in Egyptian hieroglyphics and one in Phoenician script. It was created in the early 10th century BC, and was unearthed in 1881, very likely in the Temple of Baalat Gebal.

The Egyptian writing is the prenomen of Osorkon, and the Phoenician is a dedication to Elibaal, the king of Byblos.

The details of the find were published in by French archaeologist René Dussaud in 1925.

The bust is made of quartzite, and is 60 cm × 36 cm × 37.5 cm.

Discovery

The first mention of the statue was by German archaeologist Alfred Wiedemann in 1884 in his Ägyptische Geschichte:  In English: "two fragments of a large stone statue have also been preserved [owned by Mr. Meuricoffre at Naples.]" 

In 1895, Weidemann published the Egyptian hieroglyphs:  In English: "Almost 15 years ago I had the opportunity to visit the country house of the banker Meuricoffre of Naples to get to know a large statue made of hard sandstone of King Osorkon I. Two fragments were preserved from it. First the bust, on the chest of which stood at the front, on the belt there was the rest of the cartouches, and on the rock pillar. Then a part of the base with the foot."

Phoenician inscription
1. mš. z p‘l. ’lb‘l. mlk. gbl. byḥ [mlk. mlk gbl] 

2. [lb]‘lt. gbl. ’dtw. t’rk. b‘lt [.gbl] 

3. [ymt. ’]lb‘l. wšntw. ‘l[. gbl]

Translation:

1. Statue which Eliba‘al, king of Byblos, son of Yeḥi[milk, king of Byblos] made

2. [for the Ba]‘alat of Byblos, his Lady. May the Ba‘alat [of Byblos] prolong

3. [the days of E]liba‘al and his years over [Byblos]

Notes

References

 Editio princeps: René Dussaud, Dédicace dune stame d’Osorkon Ier par Elibaal, roi de Byblos, Syria 6 (1925): 101–117
 Christopher Rollston, "The Dating of the Early Royal Byblian Phoenician Inscriptions: A Response to Benjamin Sass."  MAARAV 15 (2008): 57–93.
 Benjamin Mazar, The Phoenician Inscriptions from Byblos and the Evolution of the Phoenician-Hebrew Alphabet, in The Early Biblical Period: Historical Studies (S. Ahituv and B. A. Levine, eds., Jerusalem: IES, 1986 [original publication: 1946]): 231–247.
 William F. Albright, The Phoenician Inscriptions of the Tenth Century B.C. from Byblus, JAOS 67 (1947): 153–154.
 

1881 archaeological discoveries
Kings of Byblos
Multilingual texts
Art of ancient Egypt
Archaeological artifacts
Sculptures of the Louvre
Sculptures of ancient Egypt
10th-century BC works
Byblos
Byblian royal inscriptions
France–Lebanon relations